Igor Aleksandrovich Ryomin (born March 20, 1940 in Moscow; died March 27, 1991 in Minsk) was a Soviet football player.

International career
Ryomin played his only game for USSR on November 22, 1964 in a friendly against Yugoslavia.

External links
  Profile

1940 births
1991 deaths
Russian footballers
Soviet footballers
Soviet Union international footballers
FC Spartak Moscow players
FC Dinamo Minsk players
Association football defenders
FC Viktoryja Marjina Horka managers
Russian football managers